Mathematica Applicanda is a peer-reviewed scientific journal covering applied mathematics. It was established in 1973 by the Polish Mathematical Society as Series III of the Annales Societatis Mathematicae Polonae, under the name Matematyka Stosowana (ISSN 0137-2890). The first editor-in-chief was Marceli Stark. In 1999 the journal was renamed Matematyka Stosowana-Matematyka dla Społeczeństwa (ISSN 1730-2668 ). Since 2012 its main issue is the electronic one with the name Mathematica Applicanda with ISSN 2299-4009.

Former Editors-in-chief
 Marceli Stark (volume I)
 Robert Bartoszyński (volumes II - XXIX)
 Andrzej Kiełbasiński (volumes XXX - XLI)
 Witold Kosiński (volumes XLII - LIV)
 Krzysztof J. Szajowski (volumes LV - LXIII)
 Krzysztof Burnecki (volume LXIV)

Abstracting and indexing
The journal is abstracted and indexed in 
MathSciNet
Zentralblatt MATH
 CEON  The Library of Science (Biblioteka Nauki)
 BazTech
 Scopus

See also
List of mathematical physics journals
List of probability journals
List of statistics journals

References

External links 

Mathematics journals
Publications established in 1973
English-language journals
Biannual journals